Nashoba Regional High School (NRHS) is a high school (grades 9-12) that is part of the Nashoba Regional School District. It is located in Bolton, Massachusetts, United States and also serves the towns of Lancaster and Stow. As of the 2018-2019 school year, it had a student population of just over 1000.

History 
The high school was built in 1961, originally only being one-story high. It has since had large renovations, including many more classrooms, a new auditorium, administrative offices, and a second gymnasium.

Additionally, the school is a filming site of notable alumni Chris Fleming, a comedian and actor who used Nashoba Regional High School as the setting of “Northbread High School” in his YouTube series, Gayle (2012-2015).

In 2019, a math teacher was charged with possessing child pornography, among other charges, leading to then-principal Paul DiDomenico first going on administrative leave in 2019 and then resigning in 2020 after the teacher pleaded guilty and was fired.

Between June 14, 2021 and July 13, 2021, the school was used as a filming site for the SHOWTIME TV show Dexter.

Academics
NRHS is home to a Concord Area Special Education (CASE) program of vocational education for students with substantial special needs (ages 15–22).
The school also offers the unique NRHS Cadet EMT Program, which trains high school students and allows them to serve as EMTs with the Bolton Ambulance Squad. Students involved in the program carry pagers in their classes, and are given the opportunity to gain real-world experience in Emergency Medical Services. It is one of only a handful of programs like it in the United States.

Languages 

 NRHS offers instruction in French, German, and Spanish.

 Students learning German are invited to take part in a German exchange through Nashoba's German American Partnership Program (GAPP). Since 2009, this biennial exchange has been available to students interested in a two-week homestay and exchange experience with our partner school, the Gymnasium Weilheim in Weilheim, Bavaria.

Mascot
The NRHS mascot was formerly the Chieftain. On July 1, 2020, the Nashoba Regional School Committee voted unanimously to retire the mascot and remove any Native American iconography from NRHS. A vote was held for the new mascot and the Wolves won with 84% of the vote. The decision was finalized in April, 2021.

Notable alumni 

 Chris Fleming, comedian and star of YouTube web series Gayle
 Hal Gill, National Hockey League player with the Nashville Predators
 Greg Hill, host of the Hillman morning show on WAAF
 Clive Weeden, professional basketball player
 Koren Zailckas, author of bestselling book Smashed

References

External links 
 

Schools in Worcester County, Massachusetts
Public high schools in Massachusetts